James Henry Lau Jr. or Lau Yee Cheung (born 24 April 1950) is a Hong Kong government official. He was Secretary for Financial Services and the Treasury from 2017 to 2020.

Lau graduated from the University of Waterloo with a Bachelor of Mathematics (Computer Science and Statistics) Honours Degree and a Master of Mathematics Degree in Computer Science. 

He joined the Hong Kong government as an Administrative Officer (AO) in 1979 and was promoted through the ranks to AO Staff Grade C. He resigned in 1993 to join the Hong Kong Monetary Authority (HKMA). Between 1993 and 2004 he was the Head and Executive Director of various divisions of the HKMA.

In 2004, Lau was seconded to the Hong Kong Mortgage Corporation as Chief Executive Officer until he retired in 2012. In 2013, he was appointed Under Secretary for Financial Services and the Treasury. 

From 2017 to 2020, he served as Secretary for Financial Services and the Treasury in the administration of Chief Executive Carrie Lam. He was removed in a cabinet reshuffle, on 22 April 2020.

References

1949 births
Living people
Government officials of Hong Kong
Hong Kong civil servants
University of Waterloo alumni